Partial general elections were held in Belgium on 29 May 1904.
The result was a victory for the Catholic Party, which won 38 of the 81 seats in the Chamber of Representatives.

Under the alternating system, Chamber elections were only held in the provinces of Hainaut, Limburg, Liège and East Flanders and Senate elections were only held in the remaining five provinces, being Antwerp, Brabant, Luxembourg, Namur and West Flanders.

The main issue in the election was "the hostility of the Liberals to the growth of clerical influence, particularly in educational and political affairs."

Results

Chamber

Senate

References

Belgium
1900s elections in Belgium
General
Belgium